Andover Central High School is a public secondary school in Andover, Kansas, United States, operated by Andover USD 385 school district, and serves students of grades 9 to 12.  It is located southeast of Central and Andover Road.  There are approximately 800 students in attendance at Andover Central High School.  The school is located adjacent to Andover Central Middle School and north of Sunflower Elementary School. The head principal is Chad Gerwick, the assistant principal/athletic director is Doug Carr, and the assistant principal/activities director is Amanda Grier.

Extracurricular activities

Athletics
The Jaguars compete in the Ark Valley Chisholm Trail League and are classified as a 5A school, the second-largest classification in Kansas according to the Kansas State High School Activities Association, whilst some sports play in 4A classification. Throughout its history, Andover Central has won several state championships in various sports. Andover Central has been very productive since its inception in 2001. Both the boys' and girls' basketball teams have placed second in the state championship.  The girls' basketball team won the 4A state championship in the 2007–08 season with a 26–0 record and won the 5A state championship in 2010. The boys' basketball team won the state championship in the 2018–2019 school year as well. The boys' golf team has won state three times, occurring in 2003, 2006, and 2009. In 2009, the boys' basketball team made it to the state tournament. The softball team has won in 2009 and 2018. In 2014, the school Scholar's Bowl team won both its 4A regional tournament and then the 4A state championship; the only ACHS Scholar's Bowl team to do so. The boys swim team has won 1st place in the state championship in both 2021 and 2022.

Performing Arts
Andover Central participates in 4A Music Festival (Different from the Athletic Classification)

Andover Central has several instrumental music ensembles for students to participate, including: Marching Band (Fall), Symphonic Band, Concert Band, Jazz I, Jazz II, Pep Band, and Pit Orchestra. Band members are also able to participate in Solo and Ensemble Festivals at the Regional and State level. Band members routinely perform for the community at sports events, in honor bands, at community festivals and for other building events within the school district. ACHS Bands take group trips every two years (odd-number years) to large regional destinations (Chicago, St. Louis, Dallas) and ACHS Jazz Bands travel to Colorado every two years (even-number years) on a ski/performance trip. Andover Central has several choirs including Men's Chorus, Ladies Chorus, Concert Choir and New Generation (Show Choir). Choir students have many opportunities to perform in regular productions throughout the year, for the community, and are able to participate in Solo and Ensemble Festivals at the Regional and State level. ACHS Vocal students have regular opportunities to travel with the Choir. The Drama program produces one play and one musical each year. The Thespian club is very active and members attend the Kansas Thespian Conference yearly.

State Championships

See also
 List of high schools in Kansas
 List of unified school districts in Kansas
Other high schools in Andover USD 385 school district
 Andover High School in Andover

References

External links
 
 USD 385 School District Boundary Map, KDOT

Public high schools in Kansas
Schools in Butler County, Kansas
Educational institutions established in 2001
2001 establishments in Kansas